Alex Murray (26 December 1885 – 12 January 1947) was an Australian rules footballer who played for the Richmond Football Club in the Victorian Football League (VFL).

Notes

External links 
		

1885 births
1947 deaths
Australian rules footballers from Victoria (Australia)
Richmond Football Club players